Carlton Patrick Gray (born June 26, 1971) is an American former professional football player who was a cornerback in the National Football League (NFL) for eight seasons.  He played college football for the UCLA Bruins, and was recognized as an All-American.  He was drafted in the second round of the 1993 NFL Draft by the Seattle Seahawks, and also played professionally for the Indianapolis Colts, New York Giants and Kansas City Chiefs of the NFL.

Early years
Gray was born in Cincinnati, Ohio.  He went to Forest Park High School in Cincinnati, and was a prep standout in football, basketball, and track, running for Forest Park under coaches Lou Cynkar (High School) and James Michael Lafferty (junior high). He was awarded the Dial Award for the national high school scholar-athlete of the year in 1988.  His grandfather, Benjamin Hooks, retired as the executive director of the NAACP.

College career
Gray attended the University of California, Los Angeles, where he was a four-year starter for the Bruins teams from 1989 to 1992.  He earned consensus first-team All-American honors as a senior, as well as first-team All-Pac-10 accolades.  He finished second all-time in UCLA history with 16 interceptions.  In 1989, he became the first freshman in a decade to start at least eight games for UCLA.  In 1991, Gray finished second in the nation with 10 interceptions.  After his senior season in 1992, Gray was selected to play in the Hula Bowl and East-West Shrine Game.

Professional career

Seattle Seahawks
On July 22, 1993, he officially signed with the Seahawks. His rookie year he played in ten games, starting two of them. He missed the final six games of the regular season due to an ankle injury. He also recorded a sack in 1993. In 1994, he played in 11 games before breaking his arm against the Tampa Bay Buccaneers in week 11 and missed the rest of the season. Both 1995 and 1996, Carlton played in all 16 games. In 1995, Gray had his most productive season as a pro, being second on the Seahawks with four interceptions. He also had a career-high 68 solo tackles and 5 assisted tackles. On February 16, 1996, he re-signed with the Seahawks. During his four seasons with the Seahawks, he had a total of nine interceptions, and one sack.

Indianapolis Colts
On March 3, 1997, Gray signed a 4-year, $9.7 million deal with the Colts as a free agent.  During his one season with the Colts, he had 24 tackles and two interceptions.  On September 3, 1998, the Colts released Gray because cornerback Tyrone Poole returned from an injury.

New York Giants
In his one season with the Giants, Gray played in 14 games and recorded 27 tackles, his second career sack, and one interception.

Kansas City Chiefs
Gray signed with the Chiefs after the departures of Dale Carter and Mark McMillian.  The 1999 season, he played in all 16 games, and recorded seven tackles.  During a scrimmage at River Falls in 2000, the Chiefs were scrimmaging the New Orleans Saints, and while a Saints player was at the bottom of the pile, Gray sucker punched him. After that, he rarely played, appearing in only four games.

Cincinnati Bengals
On June 6, 2001, the Bengals signed Carlton Gray to a two-year contract. However he was cut in training camp and never played a game with his hometown club.

NFL statistics

References 

1971 births
Living people
All-American college football players
American football defensive backs
Indianapolis Colts players
Kansas City Chiefs players
New York Giants players
Players of American football from Cincinnati
Seattle Seahawks players
UCLA Bruins football players